Tom O'Connor is an Irish local historian.

A native of Kiltullagh, Athenry, County Galway, O'Connor has spent almost 50 years researching the history and geopolitics of Iron Age Ireland, notably early Connacht. His books, Turoe & Athenry: Ancient Capitals of Celtic Ireland and Hand of History, Burden of Pseudo-History, present a Celtic royal complex, unprecedented in Ireland for its size and layout, but similar to Belgic centres of power, called oppida by Julius Caesar, in SE England and on the Continent, centered on Turoe in County Galway, site of the famous Turoe stone.

Among the finest example of La Tene Celtic stone art in Europe, the stone was set on Turoe hill (Cnoc Temhro). According to O'Connor, it is part of a hitherto unrecognised royal sanctuary at the core of a Belgic-like oppidum defensive system of linear embankments, connected with the supposed Celtic invasion of Ireland.

His work has received local and national interest – especially since the construction of the M6 motorway through many of the sites – yet received little endorsement from professional historians and archaeologists.

O'Connor spent over thirty years as a missionary priest in Malaysia.

See also
 Turoe stone
 Celtic Ireland

External links 
http://homepage.eircom.net/~williamfinnerty/sd1.htm
http://www.megalithic.co.uk/article.php?sid=6333362
http://homepage.eircom.net/~archaeology/three/placenames.htm

References
 Archaeological Sites of Interest surrounding the Turoe Stone (with Kieran Jordan), Journal of the Galway Archaeological and Historical Society, Volume 55, 2003. pp. 110–116.
 Turoe & Athenry:Ancient Capitals of Celtic Ireland, 2003, 
 Hand of History - Burden of Pseudo-History:Touchstone of Truth, 2006, 

People from County Galway
20th-century Irish Roman Catholic priests